Kotreshi Kanasu (Dream of Kotreshi) is a 1994 Indian Kannada language film directed by Nagathihalli Chandrashekar starring Vijay Raghavendra and Karibasavaiah.

The film won two National Film Awards at 42nd National Film Awards; Best Feature Film in Kannada and Best Child Artist (Vijay Raghavendra).

Plot

Kotra is a vibrant young boy belonging to the lower caste, loved and admired by the entire village even the upper class for his intelligence. Kotra's passing the 7th standard is celebrated with gusto among lower caste which hurts the pride of upper caste. Kotra and his father lose jobs. Even his friends move away making him lonely and desolate. Kotra decides not to join High School thinking that normality would be restored, but his parents dreams are shattered.

Kotra's desire to pursue his studies rekindles. Their community greets his decision but the upper caste try to put obstacles to his admission. To fight for justice Kotra's father goes on a fast unto death. The local leaders take Kotra to city to seek justice through Government officials.

Kotra attracts the attention of the Minister and gets admission in the High School.

Cast

 Vijay Raghavendra as Kotra (credited as Master Vijay Raghavendra)
 Karibasavaiah as Dibba (Kotra's Father)
 Umashree Kotra's Mother
 H. G. Dattatreya
 B. Jayashree
 Sunder Raj
 Pramila Joshai
 Vishnuvardhan in a cameo appearance as Education Minister of Government of Karnataka

Awards
 National Film Award for Best Feature Film in Kannada
 National Film Award for Best Child Artist - Vijay Raghavendra

References

External links 
 

1990s Kannada-language films
1994 films
Indian children's films
Films about the education system in India
Films based on Indian novels
Films scored by C. Ashwath
Films directed by Nagathihalli Chandrashekhar